Pat Anderson may refer to:

 Patricia Anderson (born 1966), USA politician
 Pat Anderson (actress)
 Pat Anderson (human rights advocate), Australian human rights advocate and health administrator